Jocelyn Mary Catherine Toynbee,  (3 March 1897 – 31 December 1985) was an English archaeologist and art historian. "In the mid-twentieth century she was the leading British scholar in Roman artistic studies and one of the recognized authorities in this field in the world." Having taught at St Hugh's College, Oxford, the University of Reading, and Newnham College, Cambridge, she was Laurence Professor of Classical Archaeology at the University of Cambridge from 1951 to 1962.

Biography
Jocelyn Toynbee was the daughter of Harry Valpy Toynbee, secretary of the Charity Organization Society, and his wife Sarah Edith Marshall (1859–1939). Her brother Arnold J. Toynbee was the noted universal historian.

Toynbee was educated at Winchester High School for Girls and (like her mother) at Newnham College, Cambridge (1916–20), where she achieved a First in the Classical Tripos. Toynbee completed her doctoral thesis at Oxford University on the subject of Hadrianic sculpture.

She was tutor in classics at St Hugh's College, Oxford (1921–24), lecturer in classics at Reading University (1924–27), and from 1927 Fellow, Lecturer and director of studies in classics at Newnham College, Cambridge (1927–51), where her students included Lilian Hamilton Jeffery. In 1931 she was appointed lecturer in classics at Cambridge before becoming the fourth Laurence Professor of Classical Archaeology (1951–1962). Toynbee maintained strong links with the British School at Rome during her career, and served as the Chairman of the Faculty from 1954-59.

In 1962, Toynbee organised a major exhibition at the Guildhall Museum on the subject of Roman Art in Britain, resulting in a key publication. She was married. A complete list of her works was published in the Papers of the British School at Rome.

Honours
Toynbee was elected a Fellow of the Society of Antiquaries (FSA) in 1943. She was awarded the medal of the Royal Numismatic Society in 1948. In 1952, she was elected a Fellow of the British Academy (FBA). In 1956 she was awarded the Huntington Medal of the American Numismatic Society. She was elected a Foreign Honorary Member of the American Academy of Arts and Sciences in 1973.  In 1977, an edited volume of 20 papers was published in honour of Toynbee, in which Martin Robertson states that “No one has done more than she – no one perhaps so much – to establish and make clear the profound unity of the Greco-Roman artistic tradition”. A further collected volume of papers in memory of Toynbee was published in 1988.

Works
The Hadrianic school: a chapter in the history of Greek art, 1934
Roman Medallions, 1944
Some Notes on Artists in the Roman World, Brussels, 1951
Christianity in Roman Britain, 1953
The Ara Pacis Reconsidered, Proc. Brit. Acad. ,1953
(with J.B. Ward-Perkins) The Shrine of St Peter and the Vatican Excavations, 1956
The Flavian Reliefs from the Palazzo delle Cancellaria in Rome, 1957
Art in Roman Britain, 1962
Art in Britain under the Romans, 1964
The Art of the Romans, 1965
Death and Burial in the Roman World, 1971
Animals in Roman Life and Art, 1973
Roman Historical Portraits, 1978
 The Roman Art Treasures from The Temple of Mithras 1986

References

External links
Sorensen, Lee. "Toynbee, Jocelyn Mary C[atherine]." In Dictionary of Art Historians (retrieved 20 December 2009).
The Ara Pacis Reconsidered, 1953, by Jocelyn M. C. Toynbee
 Hatfield, Linda, 1972. "Jocelyn Mary Catherine Toynbee" In Papers of the British School at Rome
 J.M. Reynolds, 1993. "Jocelyn Mary Catherine Toynbee" In Proceedings of the British Academy

1897 births
1985 deaths
Fellows of Newnham College, Cambridge
English archaeologists
English art historians
Academics of the University of Reading
Fellows of the American Academy of Arts and Sciences
Women art historians
Alumni of Newnham College, Cambridge
Laurence Professors of Classical Archaeology
British women archaeologists
British numismatists
Women numismatists
Fellows of the British Academy
Fellows of the Society of Antiquaries of London
British women historians
Alumni of the University of Oxford